A Portrait of Giselle is a 1982 documentary film, produced by Joseph Wishy and directed by Muriel Balash. It features Patricia McBride and Anton Dolin along with famous ballerinas who danced the role of Giselle in the past.  
It was nominated for an Academy Award for Best Documentary Feature.

References

External links
 

1982 films
1980s English-language films
1982 documentary films
American dance films
American documentary films
Canadian documentary films
Documentary films about ballet
Canadian dance films
English-language Canadian films
1980s American films
1980s Canadian films